Black Dragon Pool  is a famous pond in the scenic Jade Spring Park (Yu Quan Gong Yuan) located at the foot of Elephant Hill, a short walk north of the Old Town of Lijiang in Yunnan province, China. It was built in 1737 during the Qing dynasty and offers views of the region's tallest mountain, Jade Dragon Snow Mountain, over its white marble bridge.

In the past, the pool itself has sometimes been dry, spoiling the famous view. In 2010, however, the park was declared a water conservation area by the local government. As of 2014, the pool stands full of water, its former beauty restored.

The park features several smaller temples and pavilions:

The Moon-Embracing Pavilion, originally built in the late Ming dynasty. The current structure is a reproduction from 1963 after a fire in 1950.
The Longshen Temple, also known as Dragon God Temple, was constructed by local Naxi people in 1737 and is located to the east of the park. It was given the name Dragon God of Jade Spring by the Qianlong Emperor of the Qing dynasty in the same year.
The threefold overlap Five-Phoenix Tower (Wufeng Tower) was built during the Ming Dynasty (1601), and today is located at the north end of the park.
Forest of Stele(simplified in Chinese:碑林，pinyin: bēi lín), is the treasure house of Naxi culture. It is composed of more than 50 famous steles from the Tang Dynasty to the Republic of China, and it has high historical value.

The park is further home to the Dongba Culture Research Institute and the Dongba Culture Museum.

References

External links

Black Dragon Pool at travelchinaguide.com
Black Dragon Pool of Lijiang at onetourchina.com

World Heritage Sites in China
Geography of Lijiang
Lakes of Yunnan
Tourist attractions in Yunnan
Bodies of water of China
Ponds of China